In mathematics, the bisection method is a root-finding method that applies to any continuous function for which one knows two values with opposite signs. The method consists of repeatedly bisecting the interval defined by these values and then selecting the  subinterval in which the function changes sign, and therefore must contain a root. It is a very simple and robust method, but it is also relatively slow. Because of this, it is often used to obtain a rough approximation to a solution which is then used as a starting point for more rapidly converging methods. The method is also called the interval halving method, the binary search method, or the dichotomy method.

For polynomials, more elaborate methods exist for testing the existence of a root in an interval (Descartes' rule of signs, Sturm's theorem, Budan's theorem). They allow extending the bisection method into efficient algorithms for finding all real roots of a polynomial; see Real-root isolation.

The method 
The method is applicable for numerically solving the equation f(x) = 0 for the real variable x, where f is a continuous function defined on an interval [a, b] and where f(a) and f(b) have opposite signs. In this case a and b are said to bracket a root since, by the intermediate value theorem, the continuous function f must have at least one root in the interval (a, b).

At each step the method divides the interval in two parts/halves by computing the midpoint c = (a+b) / 2 of the interval and the value of the function f(c) at that point. If c itself is a root then the process has succeeded and stops. Otherwise, there are now only two possibilities: either f(a) and f(c) have opposite signs and bracket a root, or f(c) and f(b) have opposite signs and bracket a root. The method selects the subinterval that is guaranteed to be a bracket as the new interval to be used in the next step. In this way an interval that contains a zero of f is reduced in width by 50% at each step. The process is continued until the interval is sufficiently small.

Explicitly, if f(c)=0 then c may be taken as the solution and the process stops. Otherwise, if f(a) and f(c) have opposite signs, then the method sets c as the new value for b, and if f(b) and f(c) have opposite signs then the method sets c as the new a. In both cases, the new f(a) and f(b) have opposite signs, so the method is applicable to this smaller interval.

Iteration tasks 
The input for the method is a continuous function f, an interval [a, b], and the function values f(a) and f(b). The function values are of opposite sign (there is at least one zero crossing within the interval). Each iteration performs these steps:
 Calculate c, the midpoint of the interval, c = .
 Calculate the function value at the midpoint, f(c).
 If convergence is satisfactory (that is, c - a is sufficiently small, or |f(c)| is sufficiently small), return c and stop iterating.
 Examine the sign of f(c) and replace either (a, f(a)) or (b, f(b)) with (c, f(c)) so that there is a zero crossing within the new interval. ME = bfe

When implementing the method on a computer, there can be problems with finite precision, so there are often additional convergence tests or limits to the number of iterations.  Although f is continuous, finite precision may preclude a function value ever being zero. For example, consider ; there is no floating-point value approximating  that gives exactly zero. Additionally, the difference between a and b is limited by the floating point precision; i.e., as the difference between a and b decreases, at some point the midpoint of [a, b] will be numerically identical to (within floating point precision of) either a or b.

Algorithm
The method may be written in pseudocode as follows:
 input: Function f, 
        endpoint values a, b, 
        tolerance TOL, 
        maximum iterations NMAX
 conditions: a < b, 
             either f(a) < 0 and f(b) > 0 or f(a) > 0 and f(b) < 0
 output: value which differs from a root of f(x) = 0 by less than TOL
  
 N ← 1
 while N ≤ NMAX do // limit iterations to prevent infinite loop
     c ← (a + b)/2 // new midpoint
     if f(c) = 0 or (b – a)/2 < TOL then // solution found
         Output(c)
         Stop
     end if
     N ← N + 1 // increment step counter
     if sign(f(c)) = sign(f(a)) then a ← c else b ← c // new interval
 end while
 Output("Method failed.") // max number of steps exceeded

Example: Finding the root of a polynomial 
Suppose that the  bisection method is used to find a root of the polynomial 

First, two numbers  and  have to be found such that  and  have opposite signs. For the above function,  and  satisfy this criterion, as 

and

Because the function is continuous, there must be a root within the interval [1, 2].

See this happen in the table below.

After 13 iterations, it becomes apparent that there is a convergence to about 1.521: a root for the polynomial.

Analysis 
The method is guaranteed to converge to a root of f if f is a continuous function on the interval [a, b] and f(a) and f(b) have opposite signs.  The absolute error is halved at each step so the method converges linearly. Specifically, if c1 =  is the midpoint of the initial interval, and cn is the midpoint of the interval in the nth step, then the difference between cn and a solution c is bounded by

This formula can be used to determine, in advance, an upper bound on the number of iterations that the bisection method needs to converge to a root to within a certain tolerance.
The number n of iterations needed to achieve a required tolerance ε (that is, an error guaranteed to be at most ε), is bounded by

where the initial bracket size  and the required bracket size  The main motivation to use the bisection method is that over the set of continuous functions, no other method can guarantee to produce an estimate  cn  to the solution c that in the worst case has an  absolute error with less than  n1/2  iterations. This is also true under several common assumptions on function f and the behaviour of the function in the neighbourhood of the root.

However, despite the bisection method being optimal with respect to worst case performance under absolute error criteria it is sub-optimal with respect to average performance under standard assumptions  as well as asymptotic performance. Popular alternatives to the bisection method, such as the  secant method, Ridders' method or Brent's method (amongst others), typically perform better since they trade-off worst case performance to achieve higher orders of convergence to the root. And, a strict improvement to the bisection method can be achieved with a higher order of convergence without trading-off worst case performance with the ITP Method.

See also 
Binary search algorithm
Lehmer–Schur algorithm, generalization of the bisection method in the complex plane
Nested intervals

References

Further reading

External links 

 Bisection Method Notes, PPT, Mathcad, Maple, Matlab, Mathematica from Holistic Numerical Methods Institute

Quasi-Newton methods
Articles with example pseudocode